Vexillum cavea, common name the bird-cage mitre, is a species of small sea snail, marine gastropod mollusk in the family Costellariidae, the ribbed miters.

Description
The length of the shell attains 21 mm.

(Original description) The ovate shell is smooth. It is longitudinally ribbed, ribs obtuse. Its colour is ashy black. The ribs ornamented with a row of small white spots. The columella is four-plaited.

Distribution
This marine species occurs in the Indo-west and central Pacific; also off the Philippines and Australia (Queensland)

References

 Dall, W.H. 1926. New shells from Japan and the Loochoo Islands. Proceedings of the Biological Society of Washington 39: 63-66
 Wilson, B. 1994. Australian marine shells. Prosobranch gastropods. Kallaroo, WA : Odyssey Publishing Vol. 2 370 pp. 
 Arnaud, J.P., Berthault, C., Jeanpierre, R., Martin, J.C. & Martin, P. 2002. Costellariidae et Mitridae de Nouvelle Calédonie. Xenophora. Association française de conchyliologie. Supplément 100: 52 pp.
 Cernohorsky, W.O. 1970. Systematics of the families Mitridae & Volutomitridae (Mollusca: Gastropoda). Bulletin of the Auckland Institute and Museum. Auckland, New Zealand 8: 1-190 
 Cernohorsky, W.O. 1978. Tropical Pacific marine shells. Sydney : Pacific Publications 352 pp., 68 pls.
 Hinton, A. 1972. Shells of New Guinea and the central Indo-Pacific. Milton : Jacaranda Press xviii 94 pp. 
 Salisbury, R.A. 1999. Costellariidae of the World, Pt. 1. Of Sea and Shore 22(3): 124-136 
 Springsteen, F.J. & Leobrera, F.M. 1986. Shells of the Philippines. Manila : Carfel Seashell Museum 377 pp., 100 pls.

External links
 Reeve, L. A. (1844-1845). Monograph of the genus Mitra. In: Conchologia Iconica, or, illustrations of the shells of molluscous animals, vol. 2, pl. 1-39 and unpaginated text. L. Reeve & Co., London.

cavea
Gastropods described in 1844